is a Japanese short-track speed-skater.

Sadakane competed at the 2010 Winter Olympics for Japan. She finished second in her opening round race of the  1500 metres, moving on to the semifinal. In the semifinal, she finished fourth, qualifying for the B Final, where she finished fourth again to end up twelfth overall. She was also a member of the 3000 metre relay team. She did not race in the semifinal, in which the team finished third, but did race in the B Final, with the team finishing fourth and ending up seventh overall.

As of 2013, Sadakane's best finish at the World Championships, is sixth, as a member of the Japanese relay team in 2010.

As of 2013, Sadakane has one ISU Short Track Speed Skating World Cup podium finish, a silver medal with the Japanese relay team, in 2009–10 at Seoul. Her best World Cup ranking is 16th, in the 1500 metres in 2009–10.

World Cup Podiums

References 

1986 births
Living people
Japanese female short track speed skaters
Short track speed skaters at the 2010 Winter Olympics
Olympic short track speed skaters of Japan
Sportspeople from Aichi Prefecture
21st-century Japanese women